Jesús Fortes Socas (born 22 June 1997) is a Spanish footballer who plays for Yeclano Deportivo as a right back.

Club career
Fortes was born in Santa Cruz de Tenerife, Canary Islands and joined UD Las Palmas' youth setup in 2013, after representing CD Marino and UD Las Zocas. After finishing his formation, he suffered a knee injury which took him out for the majority of the 2016–17 campaign; upon returning, he started playing as a senior with the C-team to build match fitness.

Fortes was definitely promoted to the reserves in July 2017, with the side in Segunda División B, and started to feature regularly afterwards. On 12 May 2019, he made his first team debut by starting in a 1–0 Segunda División home win against Córdoba CF.

References

External links

1997 births
Living people
Spanish footballers
Footballers from Santa Cruz de Tenerife
Association football defenders
Segunda División players
Segunda División B players
Tercera División players
UD Las Palmas C players
UD Las Palmas Atlético players
UD Las Palmas players
Yeclano Deportivo players